The Copa de Honor was a Uruguayan football cup competition organized by the Uruguayan Football Association from 1905 to 1920. The champion of this tournament qualified to play the Copa de Honor Cousenier against the Argentine winner of Copa de Honor Municipalidad de Buenos Aires.

List of champions

Titles by team

See also
 Copa de Honor Cousenier
 Copa de Honor Municipalidad de Buenos Aires

Notes

References

H
Recurring sporting events established in 1905
1920 disestablishments in Uruguay
1905 establishments in Uruguay